Keembe is a constituency of the National Assembly of Zambia. It covers part of Chibombo District in Central Province.

List of MPs

References

Constituencies of the National Assembly of Zambia
Constituencies established in 1973
1973 establishments in Zambia